Lucjan Trela (25 June 1942 – 12 February 2019) was a Polish boxer associated with the Stal Stalowa Wola's boxing section. He competed in the men's heavyweight event at the 1968 Summer Olympics. At the 1968 Summer Olympics, he lost to George Foreman in his first fight.

References

1942 births
2019 deaths
Polish male boxers
Olympic boxers of Poland
Boxers at the 1968 Summer Olympics
People from Stalowa Wola County
Heavyweight boxers